The 2013 Polish Speedway season was the 2013 season of motorcycle speedway in Poland.

Individual

Polish Individual Speedway Championship
The 2013 Individual Speedway Polish Championship final was held on 6 October at Tarnów. Janusz Kołodziej won the Polish Championship for the third time.

Golden Helmet
The 2013 Golden Golden Helmet organised by the Polish Motor Union (PZM) was the 2013 event for the league's leading riders. The final was held at Rawicz on the 25 April. Maciej Janowski won the Golden Helmet.

Junior Championship
 winner - Patryk Dudek

Silver Helmet
 winner - Piotr Pawlicki Jr.

Bronze Helmet
 winner - Krystian Pieszczek

Pairs

Polish Pairs Speedway Championship
The 2013 Polish Pairs Speedway Championship was the 2013 edition of the Polish Pairs Speedway Championship. The final was held on 30 August at Gorzów Wielkopolski.

Team

Team Speedway Polish Championship
The 2013 Team Speedway Polish Championship was the 2013 edition of the Team Polish Championship. ZKŻ Zielona Góra won the gold medal. The team included Jarosław Hampel, Patryk Dudek, Piotr Protasiewicz and Andreas Jonsson.

Ekstraliga

Play offs

1.Liga

Play offs

2.Liga

Play offs

References

Poland Individual
Poland Team
Speedway
2013 in Polish speedway